This is a list of hosts of Filipinas, Ahora Mismo, or Pilipinas, Ora Mismo, (English translation:  Philippines, Right Now), a syndicated 60-minute, cultural radio magazine program in the Philippines broadcast entirely in Spanish.

Main Anchor
 José Ricardo Molina
 José Vicente Fábregas Vibar, also known as Bon Vibar

Season one
Original Broadcast Dates:  March 2007 - September 2007

 Vilma Kilapkilap
 Theresa José
 Elpidio Paligutan
 Camille Tan

Season two
Original Broadcast Dates:  September 2007 - March 2008

 Armis Obeña Bajar
 María Mendoza
 Mónica Rodriguez
 Mark Jason Villa

Season three
Original Broadcast Dates:  March 2008 - September 2008

 Richard Allan Aquino
 José Juan Ramirez de Cartagena
 Fernando Gómez de Liaño
 Stephanie Palallos

Season four
Original Broadcast Dates:  September 2008 - March 2009

 Javier Escat
 Cheryll Ruth "Lot" Ramirez
 Marlon James Sales
 Carmen Tejada

Season six

September 2010 to February 2011

Hosts: Carlos Juan, Hannah Alcoseba, Francis Juen, Wilbert Sasuya, and Francis Atayza

Production staff
 Executive Director - José Ricardo Molina (Fundación Santiago)
 Project Manager - Christine Cruz Rávago
 Project Coordinator - Evelyn Ágato (BBS)
 Translators/Music Supervisors - The Scholars
 Scriptwriters/Researchers - BBS Staff
 Technical Directors - Meynard de la Cruz, Julius Ungab
 Technical Support -  Bert Espinosa, Noriel Pineda, Nap Labao† (DZRM)

External links
 Asociación de la Prensa de Cádiz - http://www.prensacadiz.org
 Instituto Cervantes de Manila - http://manila.cervantes.es
 Philippine Information Agency - http://www.pia.gov.ph
 Cádiz 2012 - https://web.archive.org/web/20171017024221/http://www.bicentenario2012.org/

Philippine radio programs
Filipino journalists
 
Lists of mass media in the Philippines
Lists of Filipino people by occupation
Spanish language in the Philippines